Wickham (Hants) railway station served the village of Wickham in Hampshire, England. It was on the Meon Valley line of the  London and South Western Railway. The station opened in 1903 and closed to passengers in 1955 and to goods in 1962. The main building was to a design by the architect T. P. Figgis.

History

Opening
The station was opened by the London and South Western Railway on 1 June 1903. The Meon Valley line had been authorised on 3 June 1897, and opened on 1 June 1903.

Closure
The station closed to passengers on 7 February 1955 and to goods traffic on 30 April 1962. The prospect was raised of Wickham becoming part of a heritage railway in the 1960s after closure of the line. Indeed, the line was leased by Charles Ashby from West Meon to Droxford, through Wickham and the line used for testing of his Sadler Pacerailer. Several locomotives arrived, including a Terrier now based on the Isle of Wight. However it was not to be. Hopes were dashed when the connection with the Eastleigh to Fareham line was lifted. This left the line isolated and the last train to run was a USA tank loco up the line. After this date the line was lifted by BR and some sections purchased by Hampshire County Council. The section between Mislingford and Knowle, through Wickham, is owned by Rookesbury Estates limited who lease the former line out to Hampshire County Council as a footpath.

The site today
The station was demolished after closure and the site is now part of a woodland path.

Route

References

External links
Wickham Station on navigable 1945 O.S. map

Disused railway stations in Hampshire
Former London and South Western Railway stations
Railway stations in Great Britain opened in 1903
Railway stations in Great Britain closed in 1955